Lordotus is a genus of bee flies (insects in the family Bombyliidae). There are at least 30 described species in Lordotus.

Species
These 30 species belong to the genus Lordotus:

 Lordotus abdominalis Johnson and Johnson, 1959 i c g
 Lordotus albidus Hall, 1954 i c g
 Lordotus apicula Coquillett, 1887 i c g
 Lordotus apiculus (Coquillett, 1887) c
 Lordotus arizonensis Johnson and Johnson, 1959 i c g
 Lordotus arnaudi Johnson and Johnson, 1959 i c g
 Lordotus bipartitus Painter, 1940 i c g
 Lordotus bucerus Coquillett, 1894 i c g
 Lordotus cingulatus Johnson and Johnson, 1959 i c g
 Lordotus diplasus Hall, 1954 i c g
 Lordotus diversus Coquillett, 1891 i c g
 Lordotus divisus Cresson, 1919 i c g b
 Lordotus ermae Hall, 1952 i c g
 Lordotus gibbus Loew, 1863 i c g b
 Lordotus hurdi Hall, 1957 i c g
 Lordotus junceus Coquillett, 1891 i c g b
 Lordotus lineatus Johnson & Johnson, 1959 c g
 Lordotus luteolus Hall, 1954 i c g
 Lordotus lutescens Johnson and Johnson, 1959 i c g
 Lordotus miscellus Coquillett, 1887 i c g
 Lordotus nevadensis Hall and Evenhuis, 1982 i c g
 Lordotus perplexus Johnson and Johnson, 1959 i c g
 Lordotus planus Osten Sacken, 1877 i c g b
 Lordotus puella Williston, 1893 i c g
 Lordotus pulchrissimus Williston, 1893 i c g b
 Lordotus rufotibialis Johnson and Johnson, 1959 i c g
 Lordotus schlingeri Hall and Evenhuis, 1982 i c g
 Lordotus sororculus Williston, 1893 i c g
 Lordotus striatus Painter, 1940 i c g b
 Lordotus zona Coquillett, 1887 i c g b

Data sources: i = ITIS, c = Catalogue of Life, g = GBIF, b = Bugguide.net

References

Further reading

External links

 
 

Bombyliidae genera
Articles created by Qbugbot